Priceless is the third English album and fifth studio album by Mexican-American singer Frankie J. It was released by Columbia Records on October 17, 2006. The album includes the single "That Girl", featuring Chamillionaire, in addition to tracks like "Top of the Line" with Slim from 112, the title track "Priceless", as well as many others. Priceless features production from Mannie Fresh, DJ Clue, Bryan Michael Cox, Stargate, Play-n-Skillz, and Happy Perez.

Critical reception

AllMusic editor Andy Kellman found that though Franke J "continues to work the smooth ballads and light midtempo material with a remarkable degree of finesse, the album contains another handful of attempts at sculpting a tougher image. While the strategy might result in the occasional hit single, it's never a good look for him. Again, he doesn't step too far outside his comfort level on the tracks [...] For the most part, the singer goes with his strengths and delivers another decent album that should at least sustain his loyal following."

Chart performance
Priceless did not perform as well as expected, compared to Frankie's 2005 platinum success The One, which debuted at number three. The album debuted at number thirty on the US Billboard 200, selling about 26,000 copies in its first week, then declined in sales, staying on the chart for only three weeks. As of January 2007, the album had sold around 70,000 copies.

Track listing

Notes
 signifies co-producer(s)
 signifies additional producer(s)

Sample credits
 "If He Can't Be" samples "Eyes Without a Face" by Billy Idol.

Charts

References

2006 albums
Frankie J albums
Albums produced by Happy Perez
Columbia Records albums